Nepal is among over one hundred countries that have submitted films for consideration for the Academy Award for Best International Feature Film. Nepal made its first submission in 1999. The Foreign Language Film award is handed out annually by the United States Academy of Motion Picture Arts and Sciences to a feature-length motion picture produced outside the United States that contains primarily non-English dialogue. , eleven Nepalese films have been submitted for the Academy Award for Best Foreign Language Film. Nepal's initial submission, Caravan, was nominated for an Oscar.

Submissions
The Academy of Motion Picture Arts and Sciences has invited the film industries of various countries to submit their best film for the Academy Award for Best Foreign Language Film since 1956. The Foreign Language Film Award Committee oversees the process and reviews all the submitted films. Following this, they vote via secret ballot to determine the five nominees for the award. Below is a list of the films that have been submitted by Nepal for review by the Academy for the award by year and the respective Academy Awards ceremony.

Caravan was filmed in Dolpali language much similar to the Tibetan, while Basain, Mask of Desire and Muna Madan were filmed in Nepali.

Nepal's first Oscar submission, Caravan was made by a Nepal-based director from France, and was funded largely by Western sources. "Mask of Desire" with its themes of native Nepalese tradition and mythology was co-produced by Japan. Basain and Muna Madan, both based on classic works of Nepali literature, were fully domestic national productions made on low budgets by international standards.

See also
List of Academy Award winners and nominees for Best Foreign Language Film
List of Academy Award-winning foreign language films

Notes

References

External links
The Official Academy Awards Database
The Motion Picture Credits Database

Nepal
Academy Award